Caladenia brevisura, commonly known as the short-sepalled spider orchid, is a plant in the orchid family Orchidaceae and is endemic to the south-west of Western Australia. It is found between Ravensthorpe and Israelite Bay.

Description
The dorsal sepal is pointed and the lateral sepals and petals are short and down-swept. The lateral sepals have narrow, red, scent-producing glands on their ends. The labellum is greenish-white with red or brown markings and a red tip. There is a dense band of calli along the centre of the labellum. Flowering occurs between August and October and is followed by a non-fleshy, dehiscent capsule containing a large number of seeds. This orchid is similar to Caladenia doutchiae but has shorter sepal tips and a more southerly distribution.

Taxonomy and naming
Caladenia brevisura was first formally described by Stephen Hopper and Andrew Brown in 2001 from a specimen collected near the Oldfield River. The description was published in Nuytsia. The specific epithet (brevisura) is derived from the Latin words brevis meaning "short" and sura meaning "calf of the leg" referring to the short lateral sepal tips.

Distribution and habitat
Short-sepalled spider orchid occurs between Ravensthorpe and Israelite Bay in the Coolgardie, Esperance Plains and Mallee biogeographic regions where it grows in shallow soil on granite and on the edges of salt lakes.

Conservation
Caladenia brevisura is classified as "not threatened" by the Western Australian Government Department of Parks and Wildlife.

References

brevisura
Endemic orchids of Australia
Orchids of Western Australia
Plants described in 2001
Taxa named by Stephen Hopper
Taxa named by Andrew Phillip Brown